The Academy of Canadian Cinema & Television's 21st Gemini Awards were held on November 4, 2006, to honour achievements in Canadian television. The awards show, which was co-hosted by several celebrities, took place at the River Rock Casino Resort in Richmond, British Columbia and was broadcast on Global.

Awards

Best Dramatic Series
Slings & Arrows - Rhombus Media. Producers: Sari Friedland, Niv Fichman, Daniel Iron
ReGenesis - The Movie Network, Movie Central, Shaftesbury Films. Producers: Christina Jennings, Tom Chehak, Scott Garvie, Laurie Mclarty, Shane Kinnear, Jamie Paul Rock, Avrum Jacobson 
This Is Wonderland - Muse Entertainment, Indian Grove Productions. Producers: Bernard Zukerman, Michael Prupas, Dani Romain, George F. Walker, Thom J. Pretak
Moccasin Flats - Stephen Onda Productions, Big Soul Productions. Producers: Laura Milliken, Jennifer Podemski
Terminal City - Crescent Entertainment, Big Dog Productions. Producers: Jayme Pfahl, Angus Fraser, Gordon Mark

Best Dramatic Mini-Series
Human Trafficking - Muse Entertainment. Producers: Michael Prupas, Christian Duguay, Irene Litinsky
Degrassi: The Next Generation - Bell Media, Epitome Pictures. Producers: Stephen Stohn, Linda Schuyler, Aaron Martin
ReGenesis - The Movie Network, Movie Central, Shaftesbury Films. Producers: Christina Jennings, Tom Chehak, Scott Garvie, Laurie Mclarty, Shane Kinnear, Jamie Paul Rock, Avrum Jacobson 
This Is Wonderland - Muse Entertainment, Indian Grove Productions. Producers: Bernard Zukerman, Michael Prupas, Dani Romain, George F. Walker, Thom J. Pretak
Godiva's - Keatley Entertainment, CHUM. Producers: Julia Keatley, Gigi Boyd, Michael MacLennan
Da Vinci’s Inquest - Haddock Entertainment, Barna-Alper Productions, Alliance Atlantis Productions, Canadian Broadcasting Corporation. Producers: Chris Haddock, Laszlo Barna, Arvi Liimatainen, Laura Lightbown
Prairie Giant: The Tommy Douglas Story - Canadian Broadcasting Corporation. Producer: Kevin DeWalt
Trudeau II: Maverick in the Making - Big Motion Pictures. Producers: Wayne Grigsby, David MacLeod

Best TV Movie
Hunt for Justice: The Louise Arbour Story - Galafilm, TATfilm. Producers: Arnie Gelbart, Francine Allaire, Randy Holleschau, Anne Marie La Traverse, Christine Ruppert
Heyday! - Pope Productions, Triptych Media. Producers: Anna Stratton, Robin Cass, Paul Pope
Intelligence: The Movie - Haddock Entertainment. Producers: Chris Haddock, Carwyn Jones, Laura Lightbown, Arvi Liimatainen, Stephen Surjik
One Dead Indian - Sienna Films. Producers: Brent Barclay, Jennifer Kawaja, Julia Sereny, Kevin Tierney
Terry - Shaftesbury Films. Producers: Christina Jennings, Shawn Ashmore, Scott Garvie, Laurie Mclarty, Shane Kinnear, Julie Lacey, Gail Harvey, Patrick Cassavetti, Paul Nicholls

Best Comedy Program or Series
Corner Gas - CTV Television Network, Prairie Pants Productions. Producers: Brent Butt, Mark Farrell, David Storey, Virginia Thompson, Paul Mather
History Bites - Mother Britain - The History Channel. Producers: Rick Green, David C. Smith
Kenny vs. Spenny - Canadian Broadcasting Corporation, Cinefornia, Blueprint Entertainment, Eggplant Picture & Sound, KVS Productions. Producers: Abby Finer, Christine Shipton, Kenny Hotz, Ira Levy, John Morayniss, Spencer Rice, Kirsten Scollie, Peter Williamson 
Naked Josh - Sextant Productions, Cirrus Communications. Producers: Richard Speer, Josée Vallée, Jacques Blain, André Béraud
Jeff Ltd. - CTV Television Network, S&S Productions, Dufferin Gate Productions, Seymour & From Productions 2, The Comedy Network. Producer: Jeff Seymour
Rick Mercer Report - CBC Television, Island Edge. Producers: Gerald Lunz, Rick Mercer

Best Music, Variety Program or Series
Juno Songwriters’ Circle - Canadian Academy of Recording Arts and Sciences, Canadian Broadcasting Corporation. Producers: Moya Walsh, Brookes Diamond, Geoff D'Eon
The TO Variety Show - Insight Productions. Producers: John Brunton, Elizabeth Allan, Barbara Bowlby, Adrian Callender
Words to Music: The Canadian Songwriters Hall of Fame 2006 - Cansong Productions. Producers: Peter Steinmetz, David Kitching, Jody Scotchmer
Live at the Rehearsal Hall - Bravo!. Producers: Robert Benson, John Gunn
Alberta Bound: A Centennial Celebration - Canadian Broadcasting Corporation. Producers: Jack Stuart, Jean Merriman, Lance Mueller

Best Performing Arts Program or Series, or Arts Documentary Program or Series
Prisoners of Age - The Eyes Project Development Corp. Producer: Stan Feingold
A Long Journey Home - Greenspace Production. Producers: Gail McIntyre, Amélie Blanchard
Danser Perreault - Les Films de l'Isle. Producer: Ian Boyd
Comedy Gold: The Hilarious Story of Canadian Comedy - Insight Productions. Producers: Barbara Bowlby, Martha Kehoe, John Brunton
Freedom - Freedom II - Sound Venture International. Producers: Bob Barrett, Ric Randmaa, Neil Bregman

Best Talk Series
George Stroumboulopoulos Tonight - Canadian Broadcasting Corporation. Producers: Jennifer Dettman, Susan Taylor, David Freeman
Au Courant - Canadian Broadcasting Corporation. Producers: Luise Massari, Claire Cappelletti, Anna Dirksen
Hot Type - CBC Newsworld. Producers: Dana Glassman, Alice Hopton, Janet Thomson

Best Reality Program or Series
Much Music VJ Search: The Series - Insight Productions. Producers: John Brunton, Barbara Bowlby, Andrea Gabourie
Venture - The Big Switcheroo: Boston Pizza - Canadian Broadcasting Corporation. Producers: Tracy Tighe, Dianne Buckner
The Next Great Chef - Next Entertainment. Producers: Edi Osghian, Andy Levine, Nick Versteeg
Bomber Boys: The Fighting Lancaster - Frantic Films. Producer: Jamie Brown
From the Ground Up with Debbie Travis - Whalley-Abbey Media. Producers: Debbie Travis, Kit Redmond, Hans Rosenstein

Best General/Human Interest Series
Stuntdawgs - Lucky Bastard Films, Omnifilm Entertainment. Producers: Gabriela Schonbach, David Gullason
Canada's Worst Driver - Proper Television. Producer: Guy O'Sullivan
CBC News: Sunday - Canadian Broadcasting Corporation. Producers: Richard O’Regan, Peter Walsh, Greg Sadler, Roger Beattie, Michael Kearns, Patsy Pehleman
Entertainment Tonight Canada - Corus Entertainment, CBS Media Ventures. Producers: Zev Shalev, Fiorella Grossi
Forensic Factor - Exploration Production. Producer: Edwina Follows
Saturday Night at the Movies - The Interviews - TVOntario. Producers: Rudy Buttignol, Thom Ernst, Murray Battle

Donald Brittain Award for Best Social/Political Documentary Program
House Calls - National Film Board of Canada. Producers: Silva Basmajian, Gerry Flahive
Big Sugar - Galafilm. Producers: Arnie Gelbart, Sylvia Wilson, Stephen Phizicky
CBC News: Sunday - Beyond Words: Photographers of War - Canadian Broadcasting Corporation. Producers: Greg Kelly, Stuart Coxe, Eric Foss
Memory for Max, Claire, Ida and Company - TVOntario. Producers: Rudy Buttignol, Kathy Avrich-Johnson, Allan King
POV - No More Tears Sister - National Film Board of Canada. Producers: Pierre Lapointe, Sally Bochner

Best Documentary Series
China Rises - Canadian Broadcasting Corporation, New York Times Television. Producers: Susan Dando, Mark Starowicz, Kelly Crichton
The Nature of Things - Canadian Broadcasting Corporation. Producer: Michael Allder
The Passionate Eye - Canadian Broadcast Corporation. Producers: Catherine Olsen, Charlotte Odele, Diane Rotteau, Angelina Stokman
The View from Here - TVOntario). Producer: Rudy Buttignol 
Turning Points of History - Barna-Alper Productions, Connections Productions. Producers: Laszlo Barna, Alan Mendelsohn

Best History Documentary Program
Breaking Point - CBC Television. Producer: Jacqueline Corkery
The Bomb - Barna-Alper Productions. Producers: Alan Mendelsohn, Laszlo Barna
The Secret Mulroney Tapes - Canadian Broadcasting Corporation. Producers: Gordon Henderson, Mike Sheerin
Icebound: The Final Voyage of the Karluk - Kaizen West Productions. Producers: Deb Proc, David Gullason
Last Flight To Berlin - Nightfighters Productions. Producer: Robert Linnell
Letters from Karelia - National Film Board of Canada. Producers: Joseph MacDonald, Graydon McCrea

Best Biography Documentary Program
Braindamadj'd...Take II - Apartment 11 Productions. Producers: Jonathan Finkelstein, Allan Joli-Coeur
Generations: A Century on the Siksika Reserve - Canadian Broadcasting Corporation. Producers: Noah Erenberg, Renée Pellerin
Ken Leishman: The Flying Bandit - Flying Bandit Productions. Producer: Jamie Brown
The Fires That Burn: The Life and Work of Sister Elaine MacInnes - May Street Productions. Producers: Hilary Pryor, Garfield Miller
The Velvet Revolution - Barna-Alper Productions. Producers: Alan Mendelsohn, Laszlo Barna

Best Science, Technology, Nature, Environment or Adventure Documentary Program
Being Caribou - National Film Board of Canada. Producers: Tracey Friesen, Rina Fraticelli
the fifth estate - Black Dawn - Canadian Broadcasting Corporation. Producers: David Studer, Jane Mingay, Jim Williamson, Douglas Arrowsmith
The Nature of Things - Nature Bites Back: The Case of The Sea Otter - Canadian Broadcasting Corporation. Producer: Christopher Sumpton 
Lifelike - Producer: Nathalia Barton
How William Shatner Changed the World - Mentorn Media, Handel Productions. Producers: Alan Handel, Malcolm Clarke

Best News Information Series
the fifth estate - Canadian Broadcasting Corporation. Producers: David Studer, Jane Mingay, Sally Reardon, Jim Williamson
Marketplace - Canadian Broadcasting Corporation. Producers: Sheilagh D'Arcy McGee, Tassie Notar
360° Vision - VisionTV. Producers: John Scully, Sadia Zaman

Best News Magazine Segment
The National/CBC News - Suzanne - Canadian Broadcasting Corporation. Producers: Catherine McIsaac, Eric Foss, Alex Shprintsen, Paul Kennedy
CBC News: Halifax at 6:00 - Sri Lanka Diary - Canadian Broadcasting Corporation. Producers: Rohan Fernando, Eric Woolliscroft, Geoff D'Eon
Canada Now: Pacific Edition - David's Story - Canadian Broadcasting Corporation. Producers: James Roberts, Michael Taylor-Noonan, Jim Hoffman, Duncan McCue
CBC News: Sunday Night - Mission House - Canadian Broadcasting Corporation. Producer: Peter Wall
CBC News: Sunday Night - Crack - Canadian Broadcasting Corporation. Producer: Bruce Livesey

Best Newscast
The National/CBC News - Strange Destiny - Canadian Broadcasting Corporation. Producers: Jonathan Whitten, Mark Harrison, Fred Parker, Greg Reaume
CityNews: CityNews at Six - Citytv. Producers: Stephen Hurlbut, Derek Miller, Tina Cortese, Katia Del Col
Global National - Global National with Kevin Newman - Global News. Producers: Kenton Boston, Doriana Temolo, Kathleen O' Keefe

Best News Special Event Coverage
CBC News: 60th Anniversary of V-E Day - Canadian Broadcasting Corporation. Producers: Mark Bulgutch, Fred Parker, Tom Dinsmore
CBC News: Canada Votes - Canadian Broadcasting Corporation. Producers: Mark Bulgutch, Fred Parker, David Mathews
CBC News: Crash at Pearson: Air France Flight 358/Pearson International Airport - Canadian Broadcasting Corporation. Producers: Bob Weiers, Angela Naus
Global National - Canadian Federal Election 2006 - Global Television Network. Producers: Rae-anne Morin, Randy McHale, Ian Haysom
Global National - Government Falls - Global Television Network. Producers: Doriana Temolo, Kenton Boston, Kevin Newman

Best Lifestyle/Practical Information Series
Til Debt Do Us Part - Frantic Films. Producer: Jamie Brown
Debbie Travis' Facelift - Whalley-Abbey Media. Producers: Debbie Travis, Hans Rosenstein
Divine Restoration - VisionTV. Producers: Stephen Ellis, Kip Spidell
I Do, Let's Eat - Food Network. Producers: Dorene Lin, John Panikkar
The Thirsty Traveler - Grasslands Entertainment. Producer: Bryan Smith

Best Lifestyle/Practical Information Segment
On the Road Again - Film Club - Canadian Broadcasting Corporation. Producers: Louis Battistelli, Malcolm Hamilton, Aldo Columpsi, Roger Lefebvre
Daily Planet - Martin Mars - Discovery Channel. Producer: Mark Miller
Daily Planet - Blast Resistant Furniture - Discovery Channel. Producer: Devin Keshavjee
SexTV - Alison Lapper - CHUM Television, Corus Entertainment. Producers: Cynthia Loyst, Judith Pyke
The Shopping Bags - Force Four Entertainment, Worldwide Bag Media. Producers: Todd Serotiuk, Tony Hrkac, Brian Beard

Best Animated Program or Series
Bromwell High - Decode Entertainment, Hat Trick Productions. Producers: Steve Denure, Neil Court, Beth Stevenson, Anil Gupta, Jimmy Mulville, Mario Stylianides, Cheryl Taylor
Miss Spider's Sunny Patch Friends - The Prince, the Princess and the Bee - Nelvana, Callaway Arts & Entertainment. Producers: Scott Dyer, Nicholas Callaway, Patricia R. Burns, David Kirk, Nadine van der Velde, Jocelyn Hamilton, Doug Murphy, Pam Lehn
Jane and the Dragon - Nelvana, Wētā Workshop. Producers: Richard Taylor, Martin Baynton, Patricia R. Burns, Scott Dyer, Jocelyn Hamilton, Doug Murphy, Andrew Smith, Michael McNeil. 
The Naughty Naughty Pets - Decode Entertainment, C.O.R.E. Producers: Steve Denure, Neil Court, Beth Stevenson, Wendy Gardner, Kim Hyde
Atomic Betty - No-L9 - Atomic Cartoons, Breakthrough Entertainment, Tele Images Productions, Marathon Media. Producers: Steven Hecht, Ira Levy, Nghia Nguyen, Kirsten Scollie, Peter Williamson, Kevin Gillis, Rob Davies, Trevor Bentley

Best Pre-School Program or Series
Gisèle's Big Backyard - Here, There and Everywhere - TVOntario. Producers: Gisèle Corinthios, Marie McCann, Pat Ellingson, Ericka Evans
Miss BG - Breakthrough Entertainment, Ellipsanime. Producers: Steven Hecht, Ira Levy, Marie-Pierre Moulinjeune, Kirsten Scollie, Peter Williamson, Kevin Gillis, Roberta Rae
Miss Spider's Sunny Patch Friends - Nelvana, Callaway Arts & Entertainment. Producers: Nadine Van der Velde, Jocelyn Hamilton, Nicholas Callaway, Pam Lehn, Scott Dyer, Doug Murphy, Andy Russell, Patricia R. Burns, David Kirk
Poko - Halifax Film Company. Producers: Michael Donovan, Charles Bishop, Jeff Rosen, Katrina Walsh, Cheryl Wagner
This is Daniel Cook - TVOntario, Treehouse TV, Marblemedia, Sinking Ship Entertainment. Producers: Matthew Bishop, Matthew Hornburg, J.J. Johnson, Blair Powers, Mark J.W. Bishop

Best Children’s or Youth Fiction Program or Series
The Morgan Waters Show - Canadian Broadcasting Corporation. Producers: Martin Markle, Rachel Bartels, Jonathan Farber
15/Love - Marathon Media. Producers: Derek Schreyer, Arnie Gelbart, Olivier Brémond, Karen Troubetzkoy, Pascal Breton
Dark Oracle - Cookie Jar Entertainment, Shaftesbury Films. Producers: Christina Jennings, Heather Conkie, Suzanne French, Scott Garvie, Laurie Mclarty, Jana Sinyor
The Reading Rangers - TVOntario. Producers: Pat Ellingson, Marney Malabar, Jarrett Sherman
renegadepress.com - Vérité Films. Producers: Virginia Thompson, Robert de Lint, Jordan Wheeler

Best Children's or Youth Non-Fiction Program or Series
Street Cents - Canadian Broadcasting Corporation. Producers: Barbara Kennedy, Wendy Purves
Heads Up! - Look Back Productions. Producer: Nick Orchard
If The World Were a Village - 9 Story Media Group. Producers: Steve Jarosz, Vince Commisso, Peter Moss
Prank Patrol - Apartment 11 Productions. Producers: Jonathan Finkelstein, Stacey Tenenbaum, David Hansen
Rocked: Sum 41 in Congo - War Child Canada. Producers: Barbara Harmer, Eric Hoskins, Samantha Nutt, Adrian Callender

Best Sports Program or Series
Hockey Brawl: Battle on Thin Ice - Nüman Films. Producers: Jeff Newman, Robert Sauvey, Shawn Watson
the fifth estate - On the Edge of Glory - Canadian Broadcasting Corporation. Producers: David Studer, Caroline Harvey, Jane Mingay, Jim Williamson
Girl Racers - Screen Siren Pictures. Producers: Trish Dolman, Stephanie Symns
Girls Don't Fight - Infinity Films. Producers: Shel Piercy, Ken Craw
Ice Storm: The Salé and Pelletier Affair - DocuTainment Plus Productions, Windchill Entertainment 1. Producers: Howard Bernstein, Richard Martyn, Mark Shekter, Garry Blye

Best Live Sporting Event
2006 World Junior Ice Hockey Championships - Gold Medal Game - TSN. Producers: Mark Milliere, Jon Hynes
CFL on CBC - 93rd Grey Cup Championship - CBC Sports. Producers: Trevor Pilling, Joe Scarcelli
NHL on TSN - Ottawa at Toronto - TSN. Producers: Mark Milliere, Doug Walton

Best Cross-Platform Project
ReGenesis - regenesistv.com - The Movie Network, Movie Central, Shaftesbury Films. Producers: Patrick Crowe, Keith Clarkson, Evan Jones, Shane Kinnear, Thomas Wallner
Hatching, Matching and Dispatching - hatchingmatchinganddispatching.com - CBC. Producers: Patrick Martin, Patrick Mackey
This is Daniel Cook - thisisdanielcook.com - TVOntario, Treehouse TV, Marblemedia, Sinking Ship Entertainment. Producers: Matthew Hornburg, Cameron Mitchell, Blair Powers, Mark J.W. Bishop
ZeD - zed.cbc.ca - Canadian Broadcasting Corporation. Producers: Sean Embury, Jennifer Ouano, Kevin Teichroeb
Burnt Toast - burnttoastopera.com - Rhombus Media, Marblemedia. Producers: Matthew Hornburg, Cameron Mitchell, Blair Powers, Mark J.W. Bishop

Best Direction in a Dramatic Program or Miniseries
Tim Southam - One Dead Indian (Sienna Films)
Bruce McDonald - The Love Crimes of Gillian Guess (Force Four Entertainment/Citytv)
T. W. Peacocke - Canada Russia '72 (CBC)
Stephen Surjik - Intelligence: The Movie (Haddock Entertainment)
Christian Duguay - Lies My Mother Told Me (Nomadic Pictures/CD Films/Randwell Productions)

Best Direction in a Dramatic Series
Peter Wellington - Slings & Arrows - Brinam Wood (Rhombus Media)
Ken Girotti - ReGenesis - Fishy (The Movie Network/Movie Central/Shaftesbury Films)
Ron Murphy - ReGenesis - Gene in a Bottle (The Movie Network/Movie Central/Shaftesbury Films)
Gail Harvey - This Is Wonderland (Muse Entertainment/Indian Grove Productions)
Ken Finkleman - At the Hotel - Doesn't Anyone Want to Ask Me About My Dress? (One Hundred Percent Television)

Best Direction in a News Information Program or Series
Michael Gruzuk - Marketplace - Chasing the Cancer Answer (CBC)
Marijka Hurko - CBC News: Correspondent - Uganda's Haunted Children : The Hard Road Home (CBC)
Cynthia Banks - the fifth estate - A Hail of Bullets (CBC)
Harvey Cashore - the fifth estate - Money, Truth and Spin (CBC)
Douglas Arrowsmith, Stuart Coxe - the fifth estate - Tsunami: Untold Stories (CBC)

Best Direction in a Documentary Program
Paul Nadler - Braindamadj'd...Take II (Apartment 11 Productions)
Julian Jones - How William Shatner Changed the World (Mentorn Media/Handel Productions)
Christine Nielsen - Rocketman (Barna-Alper Productions)
Mike Sheerin - The Secret Mulroney Tapes (CBC)

Best Direction in a Documentary Series
David Rabinovitch - Secret Files of the Inquisition - Tears of Spain (Insight Film Studios)
Michael McNamara - Shrines and Homemade Holy Places - Highways to Heaven (Markham Street Films)
Michelle Metivier - The Nature of Things - Fighting Fire With Fire (CBC)
Robin Bicknell - The World's Strangest UFO Stories - Roswell: The Truth (Mentorn, Proper Television)
Ziad Touma, Joshua Dorsey - Webdreams - Episode 1009 (Galafilm)

Best Direction in a Comedy Program or Series
James Allodi - Naked Josh - Fake It Till You Make It (Sextant Productions/Cirrus Communications)
Shawn Thompson - Puppets Who Kill - The Joyride (Eggplant Picture & Sound) 
Jim Donovan - Naked Josh - The Loneliness of the Long Distance Lover (Sextant Productions/Cirrus Communications)
Stephen Reynolds - Hatching, Matching and Dispatching (CBC)
Bruce McDonald - The Tournament - The Pee-Wee Summit Series (Adjacent 2 Entertainment/CBC)

Best Direction in a Variety Program or Series
Mario Rouleau - Voices of Soul
David Storey - Comic Genius (Vérité Films)
Joan Tosoni - Juno Awards of 2006 (Canadian Academy of Recording Arts and Sciences/CTV)
Mario Rouleau - Paul Anka: Rock Swings - Live at the Montreal Jazz Festival
Anthony Browne, Don Spence, Adrian Callender - The TO Variety Show - Toronto Jams (Insight Productions)

Best Direction in a Performing Arts Program or Series
Tim Southam - Danser Perreault (Les Films de l'Isle)
Mark Lawrence - Opening Night - Kronos Quartet - CBC
Larry Weinstein - Burnt Toast (Rhombus Media/Marblemedia)
Oana Suteu - Wire Frame
Jennifer Baichwal, Nicholas de Pencier - OAC Compendium (Mercury Films)

Best Direction in a Lifestyle/Practical Information Program or Series
Trevor Grant - Chef at Home - Hors d'Oeuvres Party (Ocean Entertainment)
John Dolin - Handyman Superstar Challenge - Pitch and Play (HSSC Productions)
Shannon Mckinnon - Opening Soon - Century (Red Apple Entertainment)
Edi Osghian - The Next Great Chef - Ontario (Next Entertainment)
Karen Pinker - Valerie Pringle Has Left The Building (CTV)
Leslie Merklinger - Opening Soon: By Design - Got Style (Red Apple Entertainment)

Best Direction in a Children's or Youth Program or Series
Paolo Barzman - 15/Love - Volley of the Dolls (Marathon Media)
Ron Murphy - Dark Oracle - TrailBlaze (Cookie Jar Entertainment/Shaftesbury Films)
Philip Marcus - Dragon (Cité-Amérique/Scholastic/Scopas Medien/Image Plus/Sovik)
Jamie Whitney - If The World Were a Village (9 Story Media Group)
Brian Duchscherer, Chuck Rubin, Stan Gadziola - Poko - Poko & Bibi of the Arctic (Halifax Film Company)

Best Direction in a Live Sporting Event
Paul Hemming - 2006 World Junior Ice Hockey Championships - Gold Medal Game (TSN)
Geoff Johnson - 2006 Tim Hortons Brier (TSN)
Ron Forsythe - CFL on CBC - 93rd Grey Cup Championship (CBC Sports)

Best Writing in a Dramatic Program or Miniseries
Andrew Wreggitt, Hugh Graham - One Dead Indian (Sienna Films)
Chris Haddock - Intelligence: The Movie (Haddock Entertainment)
Gordon Pinsent - Heyday! (Pope Productions/Triptych Media)
Bruce M. Smith - Prairie Giant: The Tommy Douglas Story (CBC
Ian Adams, Riley Adams, Michelle Lovretta - Hunt for Justice: The Louise Arbour Story (Galafilm/TATfilm)
Suzette Couture - The Man Who Lost Himself (Sarrazin Couture Entertainment)

Best Writing in a Dramatic Series
Susan Coyne, Bob Martin, Mark McKinney - Slings & Arrows - Steeped in Blood (Rhombus Media)
George F. Walker, Dani Romain - This Is Wonderland - Episode 313 (Muse Entertainment/Indian Grove Productions)
Angus Fraser - Terminal City - Episode 6 (Crescent Entertainment/Big Dog Productions)
Ken Finkleman, Morwyn Brebner, Ellen Vanstone - At the Hotel - The Perfect Couple (One Hundred Percent Television)

Best Writing in a Comedy or Variety Program or Series
Mary Walsh, Ed Macdonald - Hatching, Matching and Dispatching - Episode 5 (CBC)
Brent Butt, Mark Farrell, Kevin White, Paul Mather - Corner Gas - Merry Gasmas (CTV Television Network/Prairie Pants Productions) 
Dan Redican - Burnt Toast (Rhombus Media/Marblemedia)
Steve Smith, Rick Green, David C. Smith - The Red Green Show - Do As I Do (Red Green Productions)
Jennifer Kennedy, Ian Ross MacDonald - The Wilkinsons - Ulterior Designs (Henry Less Productions)
Mark Critch, Kevin White, Gary Pearson, Carolyn Clifford-Taylor, Irwin Barker, Jennifer Whalen, Bob Kerr, Barry Julien, Gavin Crawford - This Hour Has 22 Minutes - Episode 7 (Alliance Atlantis/CBC)

Best Writing in an Information Program or Series
Linden MacIntyre - the fifth estate - Hail of Bullets (CBC) 
Bob McKeown - the fifth estate - Rogue Agent (CBC)
Gillian Findlay - the fifth estate - Failing Jeffrey (CBC)
Sandra Batson - CBC News: Regina - Shedding the Past (CBC)
Cindy Bahadur - Daily Planet - Grounded Gollum (Discovery Channel)

Best Writing in a Documentary Program or Series
Neil Docherty - China Rises - Party Games (CBC/New York Times Television)
Jonathan Finkelstein, Paul Nadler - Braindamadj'd...Take II (Apartment 11 Productions)
Nadine Pequeneza - Turning Points of History - Aristide’s Haiti (Barna-Alper Productions/Connections Productions)
Ric Esther Bienstock - Frontline: Sex Slaves (CBC/Channel 4/Canal D/PBS)
Paul Cowan - The Peacekeepers (13 Production/Arte)

Best Writing in a Children's or Youth's Program or Series
Jordan Wheeler - renegadepress.com - The Rez (Vérité Films)
Steven Westren - Dragon - Dragon Runs the Store (Cité-Amérique/Scholastic/Scopas Medien/Image Plus/Sovik)
Bob McDonald, Ken Hewitt-White - Heads Up! - How Do We Get Around in Space? (Look Back Productions)
Richard Elliott, Simon Racioppa - Jane and the Dragon - A Dragon's Tail (Nelvana/Wētā Workshop)
Dennis Heaton - The Naughty Naughty Pets - Sock It To Me (Decode Entertainment/C.O.R.E.)

Best Performance by an Actor in a Leading Role in a Dramatic Program or Miniseries
Tom McCamus - Waking Up Wally: The Walter Gretzky Story (Accent Entertainment/Alberta Filmworks)
Tony Nardi - Il Duce Canadese (Ciné Télé Action)
Ian Tracey - Intelligence: The Movie (Haddock Entertainment)
Michael Therriault - Prairie Giant: The Tommy Douglas Story (CBC
Shawn Ashmore - Terry (Shaftesbury Films)
Peter Outerbridge - Murdoch Mysteries: Under the Dragon's Tail (Shaftesbury Films)

Best Performance by an Actress in a Leading Role in a Dramatic Program or Miniseries
Wendy Crewson - The Man Who Lost Himself (Sarrazin Couture Entertainment)
Klea Scott - Intelligence: The Movie (Haddock Entertainment)
Joanne Kelly - Playing House (Blueprint Entertainment)
Michèle-Barbara Pelletier - Trudeau II: Maverick in the Making (Big Motion Pictures)
Victoria Snow - Waking Up Wally: The Walter Gretzky Story (Accent Entertainment/Alberta Filmworks)

Best Performance by an Actor in a Continuing Leading Dramatic Role
Mark McKinney - Slings & Arrows - Steeped in Blood (Rhombus Media)
Peter Outerbridge - ReGenesis - Fishy (The Movie Network/Movie Central/Shaftesbury Films)
Gil Bellows - Terminal City - Episode 9 (Crescent Entertainment/Big Dog Productions)
Nigel Bennett - At the Hotel - Doesn't Anyone Want to Ask Me About My Dress? (One Hundred Percent Television)
Nicholas Campbell - Da Vinci's City Hall - Put Down the Hose, Pick Up a Gun (Haddock Entertainment/Barna-Alper Productions)

Best Performance by an Actress in a Continuing Leading Dramatic Role
Martha Burns - Slings & Arrows - Brinam Wood (Rhombus Media)
Cara Pifko - This Is Wonderland - Episode 313 (Muse Entertainment/Indian Grove Productions)
Andrea Menard - Moccasin Flats - Domestic Bliss (Stephen Onda Productions/Big Soul Productions)
Erin Karpluk - Godiva's - Inked (Keatley Entertainment/CHUM)
Martha Henry - At the Hotel - Welcome to the Rousseau (One Hundred Percent Television)

Best Performance by an Actor in a Guest Role Dramatic Series
Maury Chaykin - At the Hotel - The Perfect Couple (One Hundred Percent Television)
Billy MacLellan - ReGenesis - Fishy (The Movie Network/Movie Central/Shaftesbury Films)
Ryan McDonald - ReGenesis - Haze (The Movie Network/Movie Central/Shaftesbury Films)
John Ralston - This Is Wonderland - Episode 302 (Muse Entertainment/Indian Grove Productions)
Stephen E. Miller - Da Vinci's City Hall - When the Horsemen Come Looking (Haddock Entertainment/Barna-Alper Productions)

Best Performance by an Actress in a Guest Role Dramatic Series
Linda Kash - At the Hotel - The Perfect Couple (One Hundred Percent Television)
Rachel McAdams - Slings & Arrows - Season’s End (Rhombus Media)
Hélène Joy - ReGenesis - Escape Mutant (The Movie Network/Movie Central/Shaftesbury Films)
Nancy Beatty - This Is Wonderland - Episode 309 (Muse Entertainment/Indian Grove Productions)
Liisa Repo-Martell - This Is Wonderland - Episode 302 (Muse Entertainment/Indian Grove Productions)

Best Performance by an Actor in a Featured Supporting Role in a Dramatic Series
Paul Soles - Terminal City - Episode 6 (Crescent Entertainment/Big Dog Productions)
Michael Murphy - This Is Wonderland - Episode 302 (Muse Entertainment/Indian Grove Productions) 
Michael McMurtry - Godiva's - Champagne Kisses (Keatley Entertainment/CHUM)
Rick Tae - Godiva's - Rubbing Shoulders (Keatley Entertainment/CHUM)
Michael Filipowich - Charlie Jade - Choosing Sides (CinéGroupe/CHUM/IDC South Africa)

Best Performance by an Actress in a Featured Supporting Role in a Dramatic Series
Susan Coyne - Slings & Arrows - Fair is Foul and Foul is Fair (Rhombus Media)
Sarah Strange - ReGenesis - Dim & Dimmer (The Movie Network/Movie Central/Shaftesbury Films)
Jayne Eastwood - This Is Wonderland - Episode 301 (Muse Entertainment/Indian Grove Productions)
Kathryn Winslow - This Is Wonderland - Episode 306 (Muse Entertainment/Indian Grove Productions)
Patricia McKenzie - Charlie Jade - Dirty Laundry (CinéGroupe/CHUM/IDC South Africa)

Best Performance by an Actor in a Featured Supporting Role in a Dramatic Program or Miniseries
Judah Katz - Canada Russia '72 (CBC)
Dino Tavarone - Il Duce Canadese (Ciné Télé Action)
Gary Farmer - One Dead Indian (Sienna Films)
Don McKellar - Prairie Giant: The Tommy Douglas Story (CBC
Ryan McDonald - Terry (Shaftesbury Films)

Best Performance by an Actress in a Featured Supporting Role in a Dramatic Program or Miniseries
Lushin Dubey - Murder Unveiled (CBC)
Isabelle Blais - Human Trafficking (Muse Entertainment)
Megan Follows - Shania: A Life in Eight Albums (Barna-Alper Productions)
Hélène Joy - Murdoch Mysteries: Under the Dragon's Tail (Shaftesbury Films)

Best Individual Performance in a Comedy Program or Series
Mark McKinney - Robson Arms - Material Breach (Omnifilm Entertainment/Creative Atlantic Communications)
Jeremy Hotz - Just for Laughs (Just for Laughs Comedy Festival/Les Films Rozon)
Danny Bhoy - Just for Laughs (Just for Laughs Comedy Festival/Les Films Rozon)
Brigitte Bako - G-Spot - HBO (Barna-Alper Productions/Corus Entertainment/Serendipity Point Films/The Movie Network)
Derek Edwards - Halifax Comedy Festival, Episode 2 (CBC)
Richard Waugh - Jimmy MacDonald's Canada: The Lost Episodes - The Canadian Sexplosion (CBC)

Best Ensemble Performance in a Comedy Program or Series
Shaun Majumder, Cathy Jones, Mark Critch, Gavin Crawford - This Hour Has 22 Minutes - Episode 7 (Alliance Atlantis/CBC)
Eric Peterson, Brent Butt, Lorne Cardinal, Gabrielle Miller, Janet Wright, Tara Spencer-Nairn, Fred Ewanuick, Nancy Robertson - Corner Gas - Merry Gasmas (CTV Television Network/Prairie Pants Productions)
Luba Goy, Don Ferguson, Roger Abbott, Alan Park, Jessica Holmes, Craig Lauzon - Air Farce Live - AFTV 13-09 (CBC)
Steve Smith, Rick Green, Laurie Elliott, Patrick McKenna, Wayne Robson, Bob Bainborough, Jeff Lumby - The Red Green Show - Do As I Do (Red Green Productions)
Swikriti Sarkar, Ari Cohen, Christian Potenza, Paula Boudreau, Alain Goulem, Cas Anvar, Richard Jutras, Louis Philippe Dandenault, Kate Greenhouse, Tracey Hoyt - The Tournament - The Warrior Women (Adjacent 2 Entertainment/CBC)

Best Performance or Host in a Variety Program or Series
k.d. lang - Words to Music: The Canadian Songwriters Hall of Fame 2006 - Hallelujah (Cansong Productions)
Jully Black, Charmaine Allen, Nadia Goode, Andrea Hall, Camille Harrison, Jean Lawrence, Lloyd Lawrence, Kaisha Lee, Ermine Lewis, Shenelle Morgan, Teena Riley, Sharon Riley, Nevon Sinclair, Oneil Watson, Sarah Brown, Stephen Lewis - Words to Music: The Canadian Songwriters Hall of Fame 2006 - Put Your Hand in the Hand (Cansong Productions)
Mike Smith, John Paul Tremblay, Robb Wells - 2006 East Coast Music Awards (East Coast Music Association/CBC Halifax)
Brent Butt - Comic Genius (Vérité Films)
Derek Miller - The TO Variety Show - Toronto Jams (Insight Productions)

Best Performance in a Performing Arts Program or Series
Amanda Green, Sarah Murphy-Dyson, Zhang Wei-Qiang, Jesus Corrales, Johnny Wright, Tara Birtwhistle, Chelsey Lindsay, Cindy Marie Small, Jo-Ann Sundermeier, Janet Sartore, Dmitri Dorgoselets, Vanessa Lawson - The Tale of the Magic Flute (Vonnie Von Helmolt Film)
Brianna Lombardo, Michelle Rhode, Simon Alarie, Melanie Demers, Patrick Lamothe, Maurice Fraga, Audrey Thibodeau, Robert Meilleur, Marie-Eve Nadeau - Wire Frame
Isabel Bayrakdarian - A Long Journey Home (Greenspace Production)
Andrea Menard - The Velvet Devil
Sarah Slean - Black Widow (Enigmatico Films/Holland Park Productions)

Best Performance in a Children’s or Youth Program or Series
Ksenia Solo - renegadepress.com - Fear (Vérité Films)
Meaghan Rath - 15/Love - Comfort Zone (Marathon Media)
Paula Brancati - Dark Oracle - Life Interrupted (Cookie Jar Entertainment/Shaftesbury Films)
Michael Seater - Life with Derek - Grade Point: Average (Shaftesbury Films/Pope Productions)
Ishan Davé - renegadepress.com - This is Your Brain on Love (Vérité Films)

Best Achievement in Casting
Jenny Lewis, Sara Kay - Heyday! (Pope Productions/Triptych Media)
Carmen Kotyk - Prairie Giant: The Tommy Douglas Story (CBC
Marsha Chesley - This Is Wonderland - Episode 308 (Muse Entertainment/Indian Grove Productions)
Marjorie Lecker, Donna Rae Gibbs, Sheila Lane - Canada Russia '72 (CBC)
Robin D. Cook, Rosina Bucci - One Dead Indian (Sienna Films)

Best News Anchor
Kevin Newman - Global National (Global) 
Norma Lee MacLeod - CBC News: Halifax at 6:00 - Sri Lanka Diary (Canadian Broadcasting Corporation)
Peter Mansbridge - The National/CBC News (CBC)

Best Reportage
Patrick Brown - The National/CBC News (CBC)
Terry Milewski - Canada Now - Pacific Edition (Canadian Broadcasting Corporation)
Neil Macdonald - The National/CBC News - Abortion Law (CBC)
Adrienne Arsenault - The National/CBC News (CBC)
Anna Rodrigues, Terry O'Keefe, Peter Silverman - CityNews (Citytv)

Best Host or Interviewer in a News Information Program or Series
Peter Mansbridge - The National/CBC News - Canada Votes - Your Turn with the Leaders (CBC)
Erica Johnson - Marketplace (CBC)
Wendy Mesley - Marketplace - Heart of the Matter, Buying Into Sexy (CBC)
Gillian Findlay - the fifth estate - Failing Jeffrey (CBC)
Bob McKeown - the fifth estate - Rogue Agent (CBC)

Best Host or Interviewer in a General/Human Interest or Talk Program or Series
George Stroumboulopoulos - George Stroumboulopoulos Tonight (CBC)
Evan Solomon - CBC News: Sunday (CBC)
Kim Cattrall - Kim Cattrall: Sexual Intelligence (Optix Digital Pictures)
Steve Paikin - Studio 2 - Canada's Role in the World (TVOntario)
Simcha Jacobovici - The Naked Archaeologist - Delilah's People (AP TSU Productions/Associated Producers)

Best Host in a Lifestyle/Practical Information, or Performing Arts Program or Series
Seán Cullen - What Were They Thinking? (Soapbox)
Mike Holmes - Holmes on Homes (General Purpose Entertainment)
Valerie Pringle - Valerie Pringle Has Left The Building - Haida G'waii (CTV)
Dina Pugliese - Much Music VJ Search: The Series - Episode 2 (Insight Productions)
Debbie Travis - Debbie Travis' Facelift (Whalley-Abbey Media)

Best Host or Interviewer in a Sports Program or Sportscast
Ron MacLean - Hockey Day in Canada (CBC Sports)
Michael Landsberg - Off the Record with Michael Landsberg (TSN)
Brian Williams - Torino 2006: The Olympic Winter Games on CBC - Olympic Prime Time (CBC Sports)

Best Sports Play-by-Play or Analyst
Glen Suitor, Chris Cuthbert - CFL on TSN - Wendy's CFL Live: Calgary at Saskatchewan (TSN)
Scott Russell, Jack Sasseville, Barbara Underhill, Paul Martini, Mark Lee - Torino 2006: The Olympic Winter Games on CBC - Olympic Afternoon (CBC Sports)

Best Photography in a Dramatic Program or Series
Danny Nowak - The Love Crimes of Gillian Guess (Force Four Entertainment/Citytv)
François Dagenais - Heyday! (Pope Productions/Triptych Media)
David Herrington - Plague City: SARS in Toronto (Lionsgate Television/Slanted Wheel Entertainment)
Pierre Letarte - Prairie Giant: The Tommy Douglas Story (CBC
Gregory Middleton - Murder Unveiled (CBC)

Best Photography in a Comedy, Variety, Performing Arts Program or Series
David Franco - Burnt Toast (Rhombus Media/Marblemedia)
Paul Sarossy - Black Widow (Enigmatico Films/Holland Park Productions)
Brian Johnson - The Score (Screen Siren Pictures)
Milan Podsedly - The Tale of the Magic Flute (Vonnie Von Helmolt Film)
Walter Corbett - Yours, Al (Real to Reel Productions)

Best Photography in an Information Program or Series
Damir I. Chytil, J.P. Locherer - Forensic Factor - Betrayed (Exploration Production)
John Badcock - the fifth estate - Hail of Bullets (CBC)
Jim Nilson, Don Scott, Jaison Empson - CBC News: Country Canada - Legacy: The Will to Survive (CBC)
Ian Kerr - The Next Great Chef - Ontario (Next Entertainment)
Ben Matilainen - Marketplace - Chasing the Cancer Answer (CBC)

Best Photography in a Documentary Program or Series
François Dagenais - POV - No More Tears Sister (NFB) 
John Minh Tran - Cheating Death (Creative Differences)
Claudine Sauvé - LifelikePieter Stathis - Secret Files of the Inquisition (Insight Film Studios)
Alberto Feio - Their Brothers' Keepers: Orphaned by AIDS (Bullfrog Films)

Best Visual Effects
Mary Holding, Matt Hansen, Thomas Turnbull, Ariel Joson, Graham Cunningham, Robert Crowther, Ian Britton - Terry (Shaftesbury Films)
Michelle Comens, Erica Henderson, Stephen Bahr, Krista McLean, Jeremy Hampton, Christopher Stewart, Robin Hackl, James Kawano - Stargate SG-1 - Camelot (Stargate SG-1 Productions)
Brendon Morfitt, Mark Savela, Vinay Mehta, Anuk Patil, James Rorick, Craig Van Den Biggelaar, Karen Watson, Kyle Winkleman - Stargate SG-1 - Beachhead (Stargate SG-1 Productions) 
François Vachon, Christian Garcia, Michel Lemire, Stéphane Landry - Charlie Jade (CinéGroupe/CHUM/IDC South Africa)
Jason Sharpe, Sonya Amin, Eddy Xuab - ReGenesis - Escape Mutant (The Movie Network/Movie Central/Shaftesbury Films)

Best Picture Editing in a Dramatic Program or Series
Dean Soltys - Canada Russia '72 (CBC)
Isabelle Levesque - Charlie Jade - Choosing Sides (CinéGroupe/CHUM/IDC South Africa)
Dominique Fortin - Hunt for Justice: The Louise Arbour Story (Galafilm/TATfilm)
Debra Karen - One Dead Indian (Sienna Films)
Paul G. Day - This Is Wonderland - Episode 310 (Muse Entertainment/Indian Grove Productions)

Best Picture Editing in a Comedy, Variety, Performing Arts Program or Series
Miles Davren, Alan MacLean - Rick Mercer Report (CBC Television/Island Edge)
David Ostry - Black Widow (Enigmatico Films/Holland Park Productions)
David New - Burnt Toast (Rhombus Media/Marblemedia)
John Reynolds, Ken Yan, Jim Goertzen, Marc Dupont - The TO Variety Show - Toronto Jams (Insight Productions)
David Hoffert - The Wilkinsons - Nashville (Henry Less Productions)

Best Picture Editing in an Information Program or Series
Aileen McBride - Marketplace - Chasing the Cancer Answer (CBC)
Chris Cassino - 72 Hours: True Crime - Betrayed (Kensington Communications/Creative Anarchy/Meech Grant Productions) 
Deane Bennett - Crash Test Mommy - Dana Weeks (Paperny Entertainment)
Tim Wanlin - Stuntdawgs - Pipe Ramp (Lucky Bastard Films/Omnifilm Entertainment)
Sophie Mardirossian - The Family Restaurant (Anaid Productions)

Best Picture Editing in a Documentary Program or Series
Howard Goldberg - How William Shatner Changed the World (Mentorn Media/Handel Productions)
Nick Hector - Memory for Max, Claire, Ida and Company (TVOntario)
Oana Suteu - LifelikeZsolt Luka - Braindamadj'd...Take II (Apartment 11 Productions)
Bruce Lange - Five Days in September: The Rebirth of an Orchestra (Rhombus Media)

Best Production Design or Art Direction in a Dramatic Program or Series
Guy Lalande - Human Trafficking (Muse Entertainment)
Rob Gray - The Love Crimes of Gillian Guess (Force Four Entertainment/Citytv)
Marian Wihak, Ane Christensen - Heyday! (Pope Productions/Triptych Media)
Kim Wall, Kathy McCoy - Prairie Giant: The Tommy Douglas Story (CBC
Jennifer Stewart - Trudeau II: Maverick in the Making (Big Motion Pictures)

Best Production Design or Art Direction in a Non-Dramatic Program or Series
Andrew Kinsella - 2006 Canadian Country Music Awards (Canadian Country Music Association/CBC Television)
Mario Hervieux - Naked Josh - Baring It all (Sextant Productions/Cirrus Communications)
Sherri Hay - The Surreal Gourmet - The Newlyfeds (Salad Daze Productions)
James Hazell - The Next Great Chef - Ontario (Next Entertainment)

Best Costume Design
Mariane Carter - Human Trafficking (Muse Entertainment)
Alex Reda - Black Widow (Enigmatico Films/Holland Park Productions)
Lea Carlson - Heyday! (Pope Productions/Triptych Media)
Anne Duceppe - Il Duce Canadese (Ciné Télé Action)
Jennifer Haffenden - Waking Up Wally: The Walter Gretzky Story (Accent Entertainment/Alberta Filmworks)

Best Achievement in Make-Up
Donald Mowat, Jane Meade, Paula Fleet - Prairie Giant: The Tommy Douglas Story (CBC
Jan Newman, Todd Masters - Stargate SG-1 - Origin (Stargate SG-1 Productions)
Catherine Davies Irvine - Terry (Shaftesbury Films) 
Penny Lee, Karen Byers - This Hour Has 22 Minutes - Episode 8 (Alliance Atlantis/CBC)
Betty Belmore - Trudeau II: Maverick in the Making (Big Motion Pictures)

Best Sound in a Dramatic Program
Martin Lee, Lou Solakofski, Sid Lieberman, Garrett Kerr, Yvon Benoît , David McCallum - One Dead Indian (Sienna Films)
Louis Gignac, Michel B. Bordeleau, Natalie Fleurant, Hans Peter Strobl - Human Trafficking (Muse Entertainment)
Claude Beaugrand, Claude La Haye, Bernard Gariépy Strobl - Hunt for Justice: The Louise Arbour Story (Galafilm/TATfilm)
Al Sherbin, Evan Rust, Steve Hasiak, Warren St. Onge, Rob Bryanton - Prairie Giant: The Tommy Douglas Story (CBC
Allan Fung, Mark Gingras, John Douglas Smith, Martin Lee, Tom Bjelic, Tim O’Connell, John Laing, Ian Rankin - Shania: A Life in Eight Albums (Barna-Alper Productions)

Best Sound in a Dramatic Series
Sylvain Bourgault, Éric Ladouceur - Charlie Jade - Spin (CinéGroupe/CHUM/IDC South Africa)
Nicole Thompson, Brad Hillman, James Fonnyadt, Gina Mueller, Miguel Nunes, Chris Duesterdiek - Da Vinci's City Hall - Gotta Press the Flesh (Haddock Entertainment/Barna-Alper Productions)
Gord Hillier, Kirby Jinnah, Kevin Sands, Steve Smith, David Hibbert - Stargate Atlantis - The Hive (Acme Shark Productions/Sony Pictures Television)
Gord Hillier, Kirby Jinnah, Devan Kraushar, Wayne Finucan, David Hibbert - Stargate SG-1 - Camelot (Stargate SG-1 Productions)
Chris Duesterdiek, Dean Giammarco, Bill Sheppard - Terminal City - Episode 6 (Crescent Entertainment/Big Dog Productions)

Best Sound in a Comedy, Variety, or Performing Arts Program or Series
David Rose, Michael LaCroix, Lou Solakofski, Donna G. Powell, Kirk Lynds - Burnt Toast (Rhombus Media/Marblemedia)
Danny Greenspoon, Mark Radu, John Lacina, Ian Dunbar - 2006 Canadian Country Music Awards - (Canadian Country Music Association/CBC Television)
Ryan Araki, Simon Berry, Stefan Fraticelli, Stephen Muir, Peter Thillaye - Jane and the Dragon - A Dragon's Tail (Nelvana/Wētā Workshop)
Steve Cupani, Karndeep Jassal - Jimmy MacDonald's Canada: The Lost Episodes - The Canadian Sexplosion (CBC)
John J. Thomson, Steve Hammond, Ronayne Higginson, Kirk Lynds, David McCallum, David Rose, Lou Solakofski - Black Widow (Enigmatico Films/Holland Park Productions)

Best Sound in an Information/Documentary Program or Series
Steve Cupani - Extreme Weather - Wind and WaterStuart French, Lou Solakofski, Doug Doctor, Jane Tattersall, Ao Loo, David Rose - Five Days in September: The Rebirth of an Orchestra (Rhombus Media)
Ric Jurgens, John Martin - A Town in AfricaJason Milligan, Michael Bonini - Memory for Max, Claire, Ida and Company (TVOntario)
Alex Salter, Serge Boivin - Silent Messengers (Picture Plant)

Best Original Music Score for a Program or Miniseries
Jonathan Goldsmith - Trudeau II: Maverick in the Making (Big Motion Pictures)
Jonathan Goldsmith - Black Widow (Enigmatico Films/Holland Park Productions)
Robert Carli - Terry (Shaftesbury Films) 
Christopher Dedrick - The Man Who Lost Himself (Sarrazin Couture Entertainment)
Peter Allen - The Score (Screen Siren Pictures)

Best Original Music Score for a Dramatic Series
Jim McGrath - Degrassi: The Next Generation - Our Lips Are Sealed (Bell Media/Epitome Pictures)
Tom Third - ReGenesis - Dim & Dimmer (The Movie Network/Movie Central/Shaftesbury Films)
Donald Quan - Moccasin Flats - The Other Side (Stephen Onda Productions/Big Soul Productions)
Robert Carli - At the Hotel - Modern Solutions to Modern Problems (One Hundred Percent Television)
Gary Koftinoff - Life with Derek - Babe Raider (Shaftesbury Films/Pope Productions)

Best Original Music Score for a Documentary Program or Series
Bertrand Chénier - Danser Perreault (Les Films de l'Isle)
Geoff Bennett, Longo Hai, Ben Johannesen - Kim Cattrall: Sexual Intelligence (Optix Digital Pictures)
Freeworm - Black Coffee - Gold in Your Cup (NFB)
Alexina Louie, Alex Pauk - The Face of VictoryDonald Quan - The In between World of M.G. Vassanji (Clearview Productions/Cogent/Benger Productions)

Best Original Music Score for an Animated Program or Series
Jeff Danna, Steven Sullivan - Miss Spider's Sunny Patch Friends - The Prince, the Princess and the Bee (Nelvana/Callaway Arts & Entertainment)
Geoff Bennett, Ben Johannesen, Longo Hai - Jane and the Dragon - Shall We Dance? (Nelvana/Wētā Workshop)
Blain Morris - Poko - Poko & Bibi of the Arctic (Halifax Film Company)
Raymond C. Fabi - Dragon - Dragon Runs the Store (Cité-Amérique/Scholastic/Scopas Medien/Image Plus/Sovik)
Jono Grant - Captain Flamingo - Episode 101 (Atomic Cartoons/Breakthrough Entertainment/Heroic Television/Philippine Animation Studio)

Special Awards
Gordon Sinclair Award for Broadcast Journalism - Hana Gartner
Earle Grey Award - Donnelly Rhodes
Academy Achievement Award - Bob Culbert
Canada Award: Michael J. F. Scott, Anand Ramayya, Melanie Jackson, Dennis Jackson - Wapos Bay - There's No ‘I’ In HockeyGemini Award for Outstanding Technical Achievement: Ross Video, OpenGear Terminal Equipment Platform
Margaret Collier Award: Peter White
Gemini Humanitarian Award - Beverly Thomson
Viewer's Choice Award for Lifestyle Host: Marilyn Denis, CityLineGemini Award for Most Popular Website Competition: Jay Ziebarth, Jason Diesbourg - Sons of Butcher''

References

External links
 21st Gemini Awards - press release

Gemini Awards
Gemini Awards, 2006
Gemini
Richmond, British Columbia